The 2008 season was Daegu F.C.'s 6th season in South Korea's K-League.

Season Summary 

Kim Hyun-Soo, centre back and captain from the previous season, retired from competitive football in the off-season, and was appointed manager of Daegu FC's under-18 team, established the previous season.  The U-18 side was to compete in the U-18 Challenge League.  As a replacement for Kim, Hwang Sun-Pil, an experienced defender brought into the club in 2004 as a draftee, was made captain.

In 2008, Daegu became famous with their extremely aggressive football, becoming the joint equal top-scoring team of the K-League, alongside Suwon.  However, they also conceded the most goals in the league, with Baek Min-Cheol letting 58 goals into his goal. This was twelve goals more than the next worst team, Gwangju, which conceded "only" 46 goals.  Nonetheless, because of their offensive approach, their style of play was nicknamed "Bullet Football", for its speedy and attacking focus.  An eleventh place in the K-League standings was the eventual outcome, winning a reasonably impressive eight games, but drawing only two, both against Daejeon Citizen.  Lee Keun-Ho played in all 26 regular season games, finding the net eleven times. Jang Nam-Seok scored ten goals, with Eninho the best of the imports, with eight.

For the first time in its history, Daegu reached the semi-finals of the Korean FA Cup, by defeating Ulsan in the quarterfinals, following a win in the round of 16 over Ansan Hallelujah.  However, they then lost to their opponents Pohang Steelers in a 2-0 loss.  The club placed fifth (out of six) in their group in the Samsung Hauzen Cup.  Eninho averaged better than a goal a game in this particular competition, scoring nine from eight appearances.

Squad

Players In/Out

In

Out

Statistics

|}

K-League

Matches

Standings

Korean FA Cup

Matches

(N) = Neutral Ground

Samsung Hauzen Cup

Matches

Standings

Awards
Hauzen Cup 2008 Top Scorer: Eninho (9 Goals)

See also
Daegu FC

References

External links
Daegu FC Official website  

Daegu FC seasons
Daegu FC